Radhika Nair may refer to:

Radhika Nair (model) (born 1991), Indian fashion model
Radhika Nair (researcher), Indian biological researcher
Radhika (Malayalam actress) (born 1984), Malayalam film actress